Mount Fagan is a mountain rising to   west-southwest of Coffin Top and  west of Moltke Harbour, South Georgia. It was named by the UK Antarctic Place-Names Committee in 1971 for Captain P.F. Fagan, Royal Engineers, surveyor on the British Combined Services Expedition of 1964–65, and the first person to climb the mountain.

References

Mountains and hills of South Georgia